R360 road may refer to:

 R360 road (Ireland)
 R360 road (South Africa)

See also
 List of highways numbered 360
 R-360 (disambiguation)